The 2017 season was Malmö FF's 106th in existence, their 82nd season in Allsvenskan and their 17th consecutive season in the league. They competed in Allsvenskan where they finished first, and the 2017–18 UEFA Champions League where they were knocked out in the second qualifying round. Malmö FF also participated in one competition in which the club continued playing in for the 2018 season, the 2017–18 Svenska Cupen. The season began with the first Allsvenskan match on 1 April and the season concluded with the last league match on 5 November.

For the second time in recent years, Malmö FF won back to back league titles, claiming their 20th Swedish championship. The club had previously won back to back titles in 2013 and 2014. Magnus Pehrsson was appointed new head coach after the departure of Allan Kuhn at the end of last season. The club failed to repeat the UEFA Champions League group stage success of previous years, exiting the competition at the first hurdle in the second qualifying round against Macedonian club FK Vardar.

Players

Squad

Players in/out

In

Out

Player statistics

Appearances and goals

Competitions

Overall

Allsvenskan

League table

Results summary

Results by round

Matches

Svenska Cupen

2017–18
The tournament continues into the 2018 season.

Qualification stage

UEFA Champions League

Second qualifying round

Non-competitive

Pre-season
Kickoff times are in UTC+1 unless stated otherwise.

Mid-season

Footnotes

External links
  

Malmö FF
Malmö FF seasons
Swedish football championship-winning seasons